Telespiza is a genus of Hawaiian honeycreeper. All species in it are or were endemic to the Hawaiian Islands.

Species

†Telespiza persecutrix James & Olson, 1991 - Kauai finch (prehistoric)
†Telespiza ypsilon James & Olson, 1991 - Maui Nui finch (prehistoric)

References

 
Hawaiian honeycreepers
Endemic fauna of Hawaii
Bird genera
Carduelinae
Taxa named by Scott Barchard Wilson
Higher-level bird taxa restricted to the Australasia-Pacific region